Luka Cindrić (born 5 July 1993) is a Croatian handball player for FC Barcelona  and the Croatian national team.

He participated at the 2019 World Men's Handball Championship.

Honours

Individual awards
EHF Player of the Year: 2017
 All-Star Centre back of EHF Champions League: 2021

References

External links

1993 births
Living people
Croatian male handball players
People from Ogulin
Olympic handball players of Croatia
Handball players at the 2016 Summer Olympics
Croatian expatriate sportspeople in Poland
Expatriate handball players in Poland
Croatian expatriate sportspeople in North Macedonia
Croatian expatriate sportspeople in Spain
RK Vardar players
Vive Kielce players
FC Barcelona Handbol players
Liga ASOBAL players